Samantha Jane Morton (born 13 May 1977) is an English actress and director. Known for her work in independent cinema, she is the recipient of  numerous accolades, including a BAFTA Award and a Golden Globe Award, as well as nominations for two Academy Awards, a Primetime Emmy Award, and a Screen Actors Guild Award.

Morton was a member of the Central Junior Television Workshop in her native Nottingham and began her career in British television in 1991. She appeared in the ITV series Band of Gold (1995–1996) and the BBC miniseries The History of Tom Jones: a Foundling (1997). Morton's early film roles include Emma (1996), Jane Eyre (1997), and Under the Skin (1997). She received two Academy Award nominations, one for Best Supporting Actress for Woody Allen's Sweet and Lowdown (1999), and the other for Best Actress for Jim Sheridan's In America (2003). Other notable film credits include  Morvern Callar (2002),  Minority Report (2002), The Libertine (2004), Control (2007), Elizabeth: The Golden Age (2007), Synecdoche, New York (2008), The Messenger (2009), John Carter (2012), Fantastic Beasts and Where to Find Them (2016), and The Whale (2022). 

For her portrayal of Myra Hindley in the HBO film Longford (2006) she received Primetime Emmy Award, BAFTA Award, and Golden Globe Award nominations. Morton made her directorial debut with the television film The Unloved (2009), which won the BAFTA Television Award for Best Single Drama. She has starred in various programs, such as The Last Panthers (2015), Rillington Place (2016), Harlots (2017–2019), The Walking Dead (2019–2020), and The Serpent Queen (2022–present).

Early life
Samantha Jane Morton was born in the Clifton area of Nottingham on 13 May 1977, the third child of Pamela (née Mallek), a factory worker, and Peter Morton. She is of Polish/Irish descent. She has six half-siblings from her parents' relationships subsequent to their 1979 divorce. She lived with her father until she was eight, when she was made a ward of court because neither of her parents could care for her and her siblings. Her father was an abusive alcoholic, and her mother was involved in a violent relationship with her second husband; as a result, she never lived with her parents again.

The next nine years were spent in and out of foster care and children's homes. During that time, she attended West Bridgford Comprehensive School and joined the Central Junior Television Workshop when she was 13, soon being offered small-screen roles in Soldier Soldier and Boon. Under the effects of drugs, she threatened an older girl who had been bullying her. She was convicted of making threats to kill and served 18 weeks in an attendance centre.

Career

Beginnings (1991–1998)
After joining Central Junior Television Workshop at the age of 13, she was soon being offered small-screen roles such as Clare Anderson in the first series of Lucy Gannon's Soldier Soldier and also Mandy, in an episode of Boon —both were ITV Central productions. Moving to London at sixteen, Morton applied to numerous drama schools, including RADA, without success. In 1991, she attended Clarendon College of Performing Arts to gain a BTEC award but subsequently left for personal reasons. She made her stage début at the Royal Court Theatre, and continued her television career with appearances in Peak Practice and in an episode of Cracker. At the time, she had a regular role in the first two series of Kay Mellor's successful Band of Gold (1995–96).

Further television roles followed, including parts in period dramas such as Emma and Jane Eyre. Emma was a film adaptation of the novel of the same name published in 1815 about youthful hubris and the perils of misconstrued romance. The movie received largely positive reviews from critics and was broadcast in late 1996 on ITV, garnering an estimated 12 million viewers. In Jane Eyre, Morton starred as a Yorkshire orphan who becomes a governess to a young French girl and finds love with the brooding lord of the manor. Like her previous small-screen projects, the 1997 film originally aired on ITV.

She took on the leading role in the independent drama Under the Skin (1997), directed by Carine Adler, where she played Iris, a woman coping with the death of her mother. The movie garnered favorable reviews from writers, with The Guardian placing it at number 15 on its list of the Best British Films 1984–2009. Janet Maslin for The New York Times remarked that Morton "embodies the role with furious intensity and with a raw yet waifish presence" and James Berardinelli wrote that the actress "forces us to accept Iris as a living, breathing individual". She won the Best Actress accolade at the 1998 Boston Society of Film Critics Awards and was nominated for the BIFA Award for Best Female Performance in a British Independent Film.

Critical recognition (1999–2005)
Impressed by her performance in Under the Skin, Woody Allen cast her in Sweet and Lowdown, a romantic comedy about a fictional jazz guitarist in the 1930s (played by Sean Penn) who regards himself as the second greatest guitarist in the world. Morton played Hattie, a mute laundress and the love interest of Penn's character. The film was released in September 1999, to wide critical acclaim and moderate success at the box office in the arthouse circuit. George Perry for BBC.com found her to be "extraordinary" as an "adoring mute who suffers [...] She uses her eyes to convey meaning, reviving techniques of silent cinema". Morton earned Academy Award and Golden Globe nominations for Best Supporting Actress for her role, which was especially notable, considering the fact that she does not utter a single word of dialogue in the film. During a 2007 interview with UK's The Guardian, she remarked that her Oscar nomination meant "incredible things for me in the [United States]. I'm grateful for that. It means that [...] I'm able to support the industry".

Morton would next star in the small scale drama Jesus' Son, which found a limited release, and praise from critics. She received a Satellite Award nomination for Best Supporting Actress – Motion Picture for her performance. Her other film in 1999 was the romantic drama Dreaming of Joseph Lees, an adaptation of a story written by Catherine Linstrum set in rural England in the late 1950s; for her part, she won the Evening Standard British Film Award for Best Actress. She appeared in the biographical drama Pandaemonium (2000), directed by Julien Temple, playing Sara Coleridge, the wife of the poet Samuel Taylor Coleridge. She was nominated for a British Independent Film Award in the category of Best Actress. Morton also played a mermaid opposite Larry Mullen in the Anton Corbijn-directed promotional video for U2's "Electrical Storm", and provided the voice of Ruby for the Canadian animated series Max & Ruby from 2002 to 2003.

Morton found wider recognition and mainstream success when she took on the part of a senior precog in Steven Spielberg science fiction thriller Minority Report, opposite Tom Cruise. Although critics felt she was "slightly typecast" in her role of "feral, near-mute victim", Minority Report grossed US$358 million. She won the Saturn Award for Best Supporting Actress and the Empire Award for Best British Actress. In her next film, the drama Morvern Callar, she played a grieving young woman from Scotland who decides to escape to Spain after the suicide of her boyfriend. Writing for Rolling Stone, Peter Travers stated that Morton "fills this character study with poetic force and buoyant feeling", as part of a positive critical response, and she earned the Best Actress Award at the 5th British Independent Film Awards and the 7th Toronto Film Critics Association Awards.

In the independent drama In America (2003), directed by Jim Sheridan, Morton played the matriarch of an immigrant Irish family struggling to start a new life in New York. In America met widespread critical acclaim, with Terry Lawson of Detroit Free Press calling the film "an achingly intimate and beautifully observed account of the immigrant experience". Roger Ebert felt that Morton "reveals the power of her silences, her quiet [and] her presence", while A.O. Scott, of The New York Times, found the "blunt, inarticulate force of her feeling [...] at the center of the drama". Her performance earned her nominations for the Academy Award, the Independent Spirit Award, and the Broadcast Film Critics Association Award in the category of Best Actress.

In 2004, Morton starred as a love interest in the dystopian film Code 46, directed by Michael Winterbottom and alongside Tim Robbins, and played the wife of a man who witnessed a deadly accident in the drama Enduring Love, opposite Rhys Ifans and Daniel Craig. Critics were polarized for the latter film and suggested that Morton did not have enough time on screen. Nevertheless, she earned a nomination for the Best Supporting Award at the 2004 British Independent Film Awards. In River Queen (2005), she took on the role of a young Irish woman finding herself on both sides of the wars between British and Maori during the British colonisation of New Zealand. The film was a box office success at the New Zealand box office, grossing around NZ$1 million in the country. For her role, she received a nomination for the New Zealand Screen Award for Best Leading Actress.  She starred alongside Johnny Depp in the little-seen period drama The Libertine, and appeared in the drama Lassie, both of which were also released in 2005.

Biopics and directorial debut (2006–2009)

In 2006, she played the Moors murderess Myra Hindley in the television film Longford. Set between 1967 and 1997, the film depicts the relationship between the child murderer and Lord Longford, the politician who spent years campaigning (ultimately unsuccessfully) for her release. Longford was a critical success and premiered with 1.7 million viewers. Morton, however, was severely criticised by the relatives of the children who were killed by Hindley and Ian Brady, but she insisted, "It is my duty as a performer to raise issues [...] we're afraid to look at". She received a Best Supporting Actress nomination at the 59th Primetime Emmy Awards, and won at the 65th Golden Globe Awards.

Morton took on roles in four feature films in 2007. She starred as a struggling police officer in the romantic drama Expired, and portrayed a Marilyn Monroe impersonator in the dramedy Mister Lonely. Morton worked again with director Anton Corbijn in the biographical film  Control, where she appeared as Deborah Curtis, wife of musician Ian Curtis from the band Joy Division, whose biography Touching from a Distance formed the basis of the film. The film was acclaimed by critics. Roger Ebert remarked that Morton was "absolutely convincing as a plucky teenage bride", and Variety magazine found her performance to be "astonishing" and "sympathetic". For Control, she was nominated for the BAFTA Award for Best Actress in a Supporting Role. Her last film of 2007 was another biopic, Elizabeth: The Golden Age, in which she played Mary, Queen of Scots.

She made part of an ensemble cast in Charlie Kaufman's postmodern drama Synecdoche, New York (2008), alongside Philip Seymour Hoffman, Michelle Williams and Emily Watson. In the film, she portrayed Hazel, one of the women in the life of a theatre director (Hoffman) whose extreme commitment to a realistic stage production begins to blur the boundaries between fiction and reality. As her character ages from 30 to 64 over the course of the story, Morton used full-face prosthetic makeup. She discovered that she was pregnant during the filming, which had a schedule that took up to 20 hours a day. The film was a box office bomb, but garnered praise from critics, appearing on many top ten lists of the year. Morton and her co-stars were eventually nominated for the Best Ensemble Performance award at the 18th Gotham Independent Film Awards. Also in 2008, she starred in The Daisy Chain, an Irish horror film about a couple who after the death of their daughter, take in an orphaned girl, only to become involved in a series of strange occurrences. It premiered at the 16th Raindance Film Festival (London; October 2008), and received a DVD release in 2010.

In the directorial debut of Jesus' Son screenwriter Oren Moverman, the war drama The Messenger (2009), Morton starred as Oliva Patterson, a widow whose husband was killed in Iraq. She was drawn to the "feminine" side of the story and found her part to be "one of the first characters [she has] played in a long time where [she has] felt so much in common", as her brother and stepfather both served as soldiers in the military forces. Critical reception towards The Messenger and Morton was unanimously favorable, with Claudia Puig of USA Today asserting that, Morton "as always, gives a subtle, excellent performance". She was nominated for Best Supporting Actress at the 14th Broadcast Film Critics Association Awards and the 25th Independent Spirit Awards.

Morton's other project of 2009 was her directorial debut, the semi-autobiographical Channel 4 drama The Unloved, which follows an eleven-year-old girl (played by Molly Windsor) growing up in a children's home in the UK's care system, and shown through her perspective. Morton wrote the story in collaboration with Tony Grisoni, and The Unloved was first broadcast on 17 May 2009, drawing nearly 2 million viewers. It premiered at the Toronto International Film Festival in September 2009. Michael Deacon, for The Daily Telegraph, praised Morton on creating an "intense" and "vivid" dramatic film. Morton won a BAFTA for her direction in 2010.

Hiatus and return to film (2010–2014)
Following a three-year hiatus from the screen to focus on her personal life and family, Morton returned in 2012. She provided the voice of Sola in the science fiction film John Carter, based on A Princess of Mars, which received mixed reviews and flopped at the box office. She next played a chief of theory in the thriller Cosmopolis, directed by David Cronenberg. Her role, described as "misjudged" by The Guardian, earned her a nomination as Best Actress in a Canadian Film Award at the Vancouver Film Critics Circle. She also served as a jury member at the 69th Venice International Film Festival in 2012.

Morton was the original voice of the artificially intelligent operating system in the 2013 romantic science fiction drama Her directed by Spike Jonze, but in post-production, she was replaced by Scarlett Johansson. She is, however, credited as an associate producer. Morton starred in the independent drama Decoding Annie Parker (2013) opposite Helen Hunt, playing a woman with breast cancer. The film was released in limited theaters, to mixed reviews from critics. Nevertheless, Betsey Sharkey of Los Angeles Times observed that the actress "gives Parker such a humility within a warm humanity that you feel an obligation to stick with her through the mounting horrors". She was awarded the Best Actress Golden Space Needle Award at the 2013 Seattle International Film Festival.

Morton starred opposite Michael Shannon in the independent thriller The Harvest (also 2013), as a controlling mother keeping her sick son in a secluded environment. Several critics such as Peter Debruge (Variety) and Nikola Grozdanovic (Indiewire) compared her role of Katherine to Kathy Bates' Annie Wilkes in Misery (1990). Her performance earned her a Best Actress Award nomination at the 2014 BloodGuts UK Horror Awards.

In Liv Ullmann's film adaptation Miss Julie (2014), alongside Colin Farrell and Jessica Chastain, Morton portrayed Kathleen, the fiancée of a valet (Farrell) who finds himself seduced by the daughter of an Anglo-Irish aristocracy (Chastain). The film screened at the Toronto International Film Festival and had a limited release in the UK, France and Spain. Miss Julie rated average with reviewers, but the cast received acclaim. Writing for The Hollywood Reporter, David Rooney thought Morton's Kathleen was "the most satisfyingly drawn character" of the film, which he considered a "ponderous, stately affair".

Roles in television (2015–present)
In 2015, Morton starred as a mother in the First World War context in Cider with Rosie, a made-for-television adaptation of the book of the same name by Laurie Lee, and took on the role of an insurance investigator charged with recovering stolen diamonds in the European limited television series The Last Panthers, inspired by the notorious Balkan jewel thieves the Pink Panthers. Morton found her character to be a "very truthful, [...] strong woman" and described her as a "female Bond". Genevieve Valentine, for The AV Club, wrote: "Morton might at first seem a tough sell as someone so hard-boiled, but the taciturn, untouchable edifice she presents is leaking just enough poison at the edges that we look forward to watching her strike—the sort of character a six-hour miniseries was made for".

Morton appeared in Fantastic Beasts and Where to Find Them (2016), a spin-off from the Harry Potter film series, with a screenplay by J. K. Rowling. In the film, she portrayed Mary Lou Barebone, the leader of an extremist group whose goals include exposing and killing wizards and witches. Fantastic Beasts grossed US$814 million at the international box office, becoming Morton's most successful and widely seen film.

She filmed the three-part television crime drama Rillington Place (also 2016), based on the case of serial killer John Christie, who murdered several women in London during 1940s and early 1950s. Morton was cast opposite Tim Roth as Christie's wife, Ethel. Intrigued by their relationship, Morton felt the depiction of the "psychological aspect of love" in the story "really developed [her] acting chops" but considered as a challenge "to play someone so submissive" as Ethel. The miniseries premiered in BBC One and was favourably received by critics. The Guardian found Morton to be "strong" in her "difficult role", and The Independent remarked that she "gave a fine, nuanced performance" as "a woman trapped under her husband's spell".

Beginning in 2017, Morton has starred in the Hulu period drama series Harlots. She portrays Margaret Wells, the madam of a low-class brothel who seeks to improve her fortunes. The response from critics and audiences has been highly positive. The Telegraph found her to be the "standout performer", and The Atlantic noted: "While the role doesn't give Morton the same room to flex her acting muscles as, say, Woody Allen's Sweet and Lowdown, she gives depth and moral conflict to a character who could easily be a pantomime dame in the wrong hands".

In July 2018, it was announced that Morton had been cast in the role of Alpha in The Walking Dead, making  her first appearance in February 2019. Alpha is the villainous leader of the Whisperers, a mysterious group of survivors of a zombie apocalypse who—as a method of self-concealment—wear skins taken from the undead.

Since September 11, 2022, Morton stars as Catherine de' Medici in the Starz television series The Serpent Queen.

Personal life
Morton dated actor Charlie Creed-Miles, whom she met on the set of the film The Last Yellow, in 1999. They broke up when Morton was 15 weeks pregnant with their daughter, actress Esmé Creed-Miles, born 5 February 2000.

Morton met filmmaker Harry Holm (son of actor Ian Holm) while filming a music video for the band the Vitamins. Their daughter, Edie, was born on 4 January 2008, and their son, Theodore, was born in 2012. They live in Monyash, Derbyshire.

In early 2008, Morton revealed that she had been "close to death" after suffering a debilitating stroke due to being hit by a piece of 17th-century plaster that fell on her head (damaging her vertebral artery) in 2006. She was in hospital for three weeks after the incident. She withdrew from the public spotlight and took an 18-month break from film acting in order to learn to walk again.

In 2011, Morton wrote an open letter hoping her stepfather would get back in touch with her after being estranged for several years. However, it was revealed shortly afterward that her stepfather had died of prostate cancer four years previously.

On 20 July 2011, Morton received an honorary Doctor of Letters (DLitt) from Nottingham Trent University, "in recognition of her internationally successful acting career".

Charity work
Having been raised in the foster care system, Morton has often been active in related causes. In March 2009, Morton returned to her hometown to show her support for its children's homes and protest against the threatened closure, by Nottingham City Council, of one of the four establishments with 24 social-care staff facing redundancy. In 2012, Morton showed her support for the Fostering Network's annual campaign Foster Care Fortnight, and in September 2014, triggered by the Rotherham child sexual exploitation scandal, she discussed in a video interview the sexual abuse she experienced while in the foster care system as a child in Nottingham and that the police took no action when she reported the abuse. Morton had discussed the abuse previously while promoting the semi-autobiographical drama The Unloved, in an article for The Guardian.

In 2008, she was part of the Vodafone Foundation's World of Difference campaign, which gives people the opportunity to work for a charity of their choice. Whilst attending a fundraiser for the charity Medical Aid for Palestinians (MAP) in January 2009, she vowed never to work for the BBC again after their refusal to broadcast an emergency charity appeal for the victims of Israel's attack on Gaza on 27 December 2008. She was later joined by Tam Dean Burn, Pauline Goldsmith, Peter Mullan, and Alison Peebles, who also threatened to boycott the corporation. In 2009, she also fronted a television advertising recruitment campaign for social workers in the UK.

Filmography

Film

Television

Awards and nominations

Morton was made Honorary Associate of London Film School.

See also

 List of actors with Academy Award nominations
 Evening Standard British Film Awards

References

External links
 
 

1977 births
20th-century English actresses
21st-century English actresses
Actresses from Nottinghamshire
Best Supporting Actress Golden Globe (television) winners
English film actresses
English stage actresses
English television actresses
English voice actresses
Living people
People educated at West Bridgford School
People from Clifton, Nottinghamshire
English people of Irish descent
English people of Polish descent
English child actresses